Neil Pryde Ltd. (Pryde Group) is a Hong Kong based Sports Group engaged in manufacturing, distribution and brand management founded by Neil Pryde who served as chairman until January 1, 2015.

Pryde Group is a privately held company, wholly owned by the Shriro Group. It has over 2500 employees and operations in more than 40 countries. It owns a portfolio of brands in the marine and adventure sports markets: NeilPryde, Cabrinha, JP-Australia, Imagine Surf and NP Waterwear and Accessories.

Products
Wind surfing gear
One of the products of Neil Pryde is the RS:X, which was the Olympic class of sailboard used by all competitors used for the first time at the 2008 Summer Olympics.

References

External links
 Neil Pryde official website

Water sports equipment manufacturers
Sporting goods manufacturers of Hong Kong